Mark Collet may refer to:

 Sir Mark Collet, 1st Baronet (1816–1905), English merchant, banker and baronet
 Mark Wilkes Collet (1826–1863), US Civil War officer
 Sir Mark Edlmann Collet (1864–1944), of the Collet baronets

See also
 Mark Collett (born 1980), British nationalist political activist
 Colet